Deudorix caliginosa, the dark brown playboy, is a butterfly in the family Lycaenidae. It is found in Ivory Coast, Ghana, southern Nigeria, Cameroon, Bioko, São Tomé and Príncipe, the Republic of the Congo, Uganda, western Kenya, north-western Tanzania, Malawi, Zambia, Mozambique and eastern Zimbabwe. The butterfly's habitat is forest.

Adults have been recorded feeding from flowers on bushes and both sexes mud-puddle.

References

External links
Die Gross-Schmetterlinge der Erde 13: Die Afrikanischen Tagfalter. Plate XIII 66 e

Butterflies described in 1903
Deudorigini
Deudorix
Butterflies of Africa